The Uithuizen Gas Plant is a main natural gas terminal in the Netherlands.

History
The plant has been running since 1975. The gas field was discovered in 1970. Neptune Energy now run the site. Neptune Energy have run two natural gas pipelines in the UK. Neptune Energy has also ran the pipeline to the Balgzand Gas Plant, since 2008, which has Dutch, British, Danish and German natural gas.

Structure
The site is close to the most-northern part of the Netherlands, in the north-east of the country.

Operation

Natural gas reaches the processing plant via 470km of pipelines, from 75 separate platforms.

From the site, the gas is distributed around the Netherlands by Gasunie (Gas Transport Services B.V.). Condensate is transferred along an 8km pipeline to Roodeschool railway station. 

Over a year the plant processes 7 billion normal cubic meters of natural gas.

See also
 List of oil and gas fields of the North Sea

References

External links
 NGT

1975 establishments in the Netherlands
Energy infrastructure completed in 1975
Energy infrastructure in the Netherlands
Het Hogeland
Natural gas infrastructure in the Netherlands
Natural gas plants